The 1998 US Open was a tennis tournament played on outdoor hardcourts at the USTA National Tennis Center in New York City in New York in the United States. It was the 118th edition of the US Open and was held from August 31 through September 13, 1998.

Seniors

Men's singles

 Patrick Rafter defeated  Mark Philippoussis, 6–3, 3–6, 6–2, 6–0
• It was Rafter's 2nd and last career Grand Slam singles title and his 2nd at the US Open.

Women's singles

 Lindsay Davenport defeated  Martina Hingis, 6–3, 7–5
• It was Davenport's 1st career Grand Slam singles title and her 1st and only at the US Open.

Men's doubles

 Sandon Stolle /  Cyril Suk defeated  Mark Knowles /  Daniel Nestor, 4–6, 7–6, 6–2
• It was Stolle's 1st and only career Grand Slam doubles title.
• It was Suk's 1st and only career Grand Slam doubles title.

Women's doubles

 Martina Hingis /  Jana Novotná defeated  Lindsay Davenport /  Natasha Zvereva 6–3, 6–3
 It was Hingis' 10th career Grand Slam title and her 2nd and last US Open title. It was Novotná's 17th and last career Grand Slam title and her 4th US Open title. With this victory Hingis completed the second doubles Grand Slam in a calendar year in the Open Era, with Martina Navratilova and Pam Shriver having completed the first in 1984.

Mixed doubles

 Serena Williams /  Max Mirnyi defeated  Lisa Raymond /  Patrick Galbraith 6–2, 6–2
• It was Williams's 2nd career Grand Slam mixed doubles title and her 1st at the US Open.
• It was Mirnyi's 2nd career Grand Slam mixed doubles title and his 1st at the US Open.

Juniors

Boys' singles

 David Nalbandian defeated  Roger Federer 6–3, 7–5

Girls' singles

 Jelena Dokić defeated  Katarina Srebotnik 6–4, 6–2

Boys' doubles

 K. J. Hippensteel /  David Martin defeated  Andy Ram /  Lovro Zovko 6–7, 7–6, 6–2

Girls' doubles

 Kim Clijsters /  Eva Dyrberg defeated  Jelena Dokić /  Evie Dominikovic 7–6, 6–4

Notes

External links
 Official US Open website

 
 

 
US Open
US Open (tennis) by year
US Open
US Open
US Open
US Open